Mount Childs is a  mountain summit located within Olympic National Park in Jefferson County of Washington state. Mount Childs is part of the Bailey Range, which is a subrange of the Olympic Mountains, and is set within the Daniel J. Evans Wilderness. Precipitation runoff from the mountain drains west into headwaters of the Hoh River, and east into  Goldie River, which is a tributary of the Elwha River. The first ascent of the summit was made August 6, 1961, by Doug Waali, Bob Wood, and Kent Heathershaw via the east slope.

Etymology

A peak was named by the Seattle Press Expedition to honor George William Childs (1829–1894), publisher of the Philadelphia Public Ledger newspaper. That peak is today known instead as Mount Barnes, and Mount Childs now resides two miles north of its original position. The name has not been officially adopted by the United States Board on Geographic Names, so the peak is not labelled on USGS maps.

Climate

Based on the Köppen climate classification, Mount Childs is located in the marine west coast climate zone of western North America. Most weather fronts originate in the Pacific Ocean, and travel east toward the Olympic Mountains. As fronts approach, they are forced upward by the peaks of the Olympic Range, causing them to drop their moisture in the form of rain or snowfall (Orographic lift). As a result, the Olympics experience high precipitation, especially during the winter months. During winter months, weather is usually cloudy, but due to high pressure systems over the Pacific Ocean that intensify during summer months, there is often little or no cloud cover during the summer.

Geology

The Olympic Mountains are composed of obducted clastic wedge material and oceanic crust, primarily Eocene sandstone, turbidite, and basaltic oceanic crust. The mountains were sculpted during the Pleistocene era by erosion and glaciers advancing and retreating multiple times.

See also

 Olympic Mountains
 Geology of the Pacific Northwest

References

External links
 

Olympic Mountains
Mountains of Washington (state)
Landforms of Olympic National Park
Mountains of Jefferson County, Washington
North American 1000 m summits